Yeon Woo-jin (born Kim Bong-hwe on July 5, 1984) is a South Korean actor. He started in the entertainment industry as a model and gained recognition as an actor with his role in Arang and the Magistrate (2012) which earned him a nomination for Best New Actor. He expands his acting repertoire on leading roles in Marriage, Not Dating (2014), Divorce Lawyer in Love (2015), Introverted Boss (2017), Queen for Seven Days (2017) and Judge vs. Judge (2017).

Career

2007–2013: Beginnings
Kim began his career as a fashion model at the 2007 Seoul Fashion Week and for jeans brand Evisu in 2008. He made his acting debut in the queer coming-of-age film Just Friends? in 2009 under the stage name Seo Ji-hoo. His management agency later changed his stage name to Yeon Woo-jin.

After playing a teacher in 2010 daily drama All My Love, he started to gain recognition as the youngest brother in hit 2011 family drama Ojakgyo Family. Then in his first lead role, Yeon's character falls in love with the daughter of his brother's murderer in the 4-episode Drama Special Just an Ordinary Love Story.

In 2012, he was cast as a mysterious villain in the period fantasy-romance Arang and the Magistrate. Yeon reunited with Arang director Kim Sang-ho in 2013, to again play the protagonist's rival in the gangster melodrama When a Man Falls in Love.

2014–present: Leading roles and rising popularity
This was followed by leading roles in two romantic comedy series: as a commitment-phobic plastic surgeon in Marriage, Not Dating (2014) and as a vengeful office manager-turned-attorney in Divorce Lawyer in Love (2015).

In 2017, he starred in the tvN romance comedy drama Introverted Boss. He then starred in historical melodrama Queen for Seven Days as well as legal drama Judge vs. Judge. 

In 2018, Yeon starred in the medical exorcism drama Priest.

In 2019, Yeon was cast in the music romance drama I Wanna Hear Your Song.

In 2022, Yeon appeared in romantic drama film, Serve the People written and directed by Jang Cheol-soo opposite Ji An. The film based on the eponymous novel by Yan Lianke, drew wide attention and Yeon was praised for his performance as a model soldier. Later in March 2022, Yeon confirmed that on the 10th of Yeon Woo-jin's official Japanese website, an announcement was posted under the heading 'About the schedule of the 2022 visit to Japan event'. They held fan meetings in Tokyo on August 11 and Osaka on August 13.

Filmography

Film

Television series

Web series

Hosting

Awards and nominations

References

External links
  
 
 

South Korean male television actors
21st-century South Korean male actors
1984 births
Living people
South Korean male film actors
People from Gangneung
Sejong University alumni